{{safesubst:#invoke:RfD|||month = March
|day = 13
|year = 2023
|time = 22:01
|timestamp = 20230313220124

|content=
REDIRECT Natuna Regency

}}